Charles Rodolf was a member of the Wisconsin State Assembly and the Wisconsin State Senate.

Biography
Rodolf was born in Zurzach, Switzerland, in 1818. He moved to New Orleans, Louisiana in 1833 and to Wiota, Wisconsin in 1834.

His brother, Theodore Rodolf, was also a member of the Assembly.

Career
After twice being a member of the Assembly, Rodolf was a member of the Senate from 1859 to 1860. In 1864, he was a candidate for the United States House of Representatives from Wisconsin's 3rd congressional district, losing to incumbent Amasa Cobb. He was a Democrat.

References

People from Zurzach District
Swiss emigrants to the United States
Politicians from New Orleans
People from Wiota, Wisconsin
Democratic Party Wisconsin state senators
Democratic Party members of the Wisconsin State Assembly
1818 births
Year of death missing